Work is an extended play (EP) by English DJ Marcus Marr and Australian musician Chet Faker. The EP is the result of four days studio time that resulted from a spontaneous Twitter exchange.

Reviews
Sally McMullen of MusicFeeds said; "Work is a symmetry of two sonic worlds that usually keep their distance. The fusion of electro beats and soulful indie pop vocals makes for a combination that is challenging, compelling and easy on the ears."

Singles
"The Trouble with Us" was promoted as the first single from the EP and was released on 16 October 2015.

Track listing

Commercial performance
In Australia, the EP debuted at number 42.

References

2015 EPs
EPs by Australian artists
Chet Faker albums